The Russian First Division 2000 was the ninth edition of the Russian First Division.

Overview

Standings

Top goalscorers 

26 goals
Andrei Fedkov (FC Sokol Saratov)

19 goals
Nail Galimov (FC Lokomotiv Chita)

17 goals
Konstantin Paramonov (FC Amkar Perm)

15 goals
Valeri Solyanik (FC Kristall Smolensk)

13 goals
Leonid Markevich (FC Sokol Saratov)

12 goals
Vladimir Filippov (FC Rubin Kazan)
Mikhail Nikitin (FC Sokol Saratov)

11 goals
Nikolai Kurilov (FC Gazovik-Gazprom Izhevsk)

10 goals
 Gocha Gogrichiani (FC Zhemchuzhina Sochi)
 Aleksandrs Jeļisejevs (FC Arsenal Tula)
Aleksandr Katasonov (FC Spartak-Chukotka Moscow)
Aleksandr Krotov (FC Volgar-Gazprom Astrakhan)
Vladimir Lebed (FC Torpedo-ZIL Moscow)
Aleksandr Studzinsky (FC Kristall Smolensk)
 Nazim Suleymanov (FC Zhemchuzhina Sochi)

See also
Russian Top Division 2000
Russian Second Division 2000

External links
2000 Russian First Division by Footballfacts

2
Russian First League seasons
Russia
Russia